The 2010–11 Green Bay Phoenix men's basketball team represents the University of Wisconsin–Green Bay in the 2010–11 NCAA Division I men's basketball season. Their head coach was Brian Wardle. The Phoenix played their home games at the Resch Center and were members of the Horizon League. They finished the season 14–18, 8–10 in Horizon League play and lost in the first round of the 2011 Horizon League men's basketball tournament to Wright State.

2010 recruiting class

Roster

Schedule

|-
!colspan=9| Exhibition

|-
!colspan=9| Regular season

|-
!colspan=9| Horizon League tournament

References

Green Bay Phoenix Men's
Green Bay Phoenix men's basketball seasons
Green Bay Phoenix men's basket
Green Bay Phoenix men's basket